Zoran Verushevski was the third director of the Administration for Security and Counterintelligence  (UBK), the domestic counter-intelligence and security agency of the Republic of Macedonia.

Arrest 
He was arrested in January 2015, and  he is still under arrest by Macedonian authorities under suspicion of two crimes: espionage and assisting in violence towards representatives of the highest state organs. Opposition leader Zoran Zaev was also charged, on January 31, with "conspiring with a foreign intelligence service to topple the government" and foreign diplomats are also allegedly involved in the alleged coup d'état.

References

 

Macedonian politicians
Living people
Macedonian prisoners and detainees
Prisoners and detainees of North Macedonia
Year of birth missing (living people)